Sanjay Majumder (born 20 December 1987) is an Indian first-class cricketer who plays for Tripura. He made his first-class debut for Tripura in the 2012-13 Ranji Trophy on 1 December 2012.

References

External links
 

1987 births
Living people
Indian cricketers
Tripura cricketers